The following is a list of fictional characters from Dark, a German science fiction thriller web television series, co-created by Baran bo Odar and Jantje Friese. The series stars a large ensemble cast lead by Louis Hofmann in the role of Jonas Kahnwald.

Overview

Cast Table

Main Cast

Series 1
Louis Hofmann as Jonas Kahnwald
Daan Lennard Liebrenz as Mikkel Nielsen
Oliver Masucci as Ulrich Nielsen
Jördis Triebel as Katharina Nielsen
Maja Schöne as Hannah Kahnwald
Karoline Eichhorn as Charlotte Doppler
Deborah Kaufmann as Regina Tiedemann
Lisa Vicari as Martha Nielsen
Moritz Jahn as Magnus Nielsen
Paul Lux as Bartosz Tiedemann
Gina Alice Stiebitz as Franziska Doppler
Stephan Kampwirth as Peter Doppler
Hermann Beyer as Helge Doppler
Ludger Bökelmann as Ulrich Nielsen (1986)
Nele Trebs as Katharina Nielsen (1986)
Ella Lee as Hannah Kahnwald (1986)
Peter Benedict as Aleksander Tiedemann
Tatja Seibt as Jana Nielsen
Walter Kreye as Tronte Nielsen
Julika Jenkins as Claudia Tiedemann (1986)
Anne Ratte-Polle as Ines Kahnwald (1986)
Lydia Makrides as Regina Tiedemann (1986)
Peter Schneider as Helge Doppler (1986)
Carlotta von Falkenhayn as Elisabeth Doppler
Angela Winkler as Ines Kahnwald
Christian Pätzold as Egon Tiedemann (1986)
Andreas Pietschmann as The Stranger
Christian Steyer as H.G. Tannhaus (1986)
Mark Waschke as Noah

Series 2
Louis Hofmann as Jonas Kahnwald
Maja Schöne as Hannah Kahnwald
Jördis Triebel as Katharina Nielsen
Karoline Eichhorn as Charlotte Doppler
Deborah Kaufmann as Regina Tiedemann
Lisa Vicari as Martha Nielsen
Moritz Jahn as Magnus Nielsen
Paul Lux as Bartosz Tiedemann
Gina Alice Stiebitz as Franziska Doppler
Carlotta von Falkenhayn as Elisabeth Doppler
Julika Jenkins as Claudia Tiedemann (1987)
Christian Pätzold as Egon Tiedemann (1987)
Stephan Kampwirth as Peter Doppler
Peter Benedict as Aleksander Tiedemann
Oliver Masucci as Ulrich Nielsen
Daan Lennard Liebrenz as Mikkel Nielsen
Andreas Pietschmann as The Stranger
Mark Waschke as Noah
Dietrich Hollinderbäumer as Adam
Lisa Kreuzer as Claudia Tiedemann

Series 3
Louis Hofmann as Jonas Kahnwald
Lisa Vicari as Martha Nielsen
Maja Schöne as Hannah Kahnwald
Jördis Triebel as Katharina Nielsen
Karoline Eichhorn as Charlotte Doppler
Moritz Jahn as Magnus Nielsen
Paul Lux as Bartosz Tiedemann
Gina Alice Stiebitz as Franziska Doppler
Julika Jenkins as Claudia Tiedemann
Carlotta von Falkenhayn as Elisabeth Doppler
Stephan Kampwirth as Peter Doppler
Oliver Masucci as Ulrich Nielsen
Peter Benedict as Aleksander Tiedemann
Andreas Pietschmann as The Stranger
Dietrich Hollinderbäumer as Adam
Barbara Nüsse as Eva
Nina Kronjäger as Female Stranger
Mark Waschke as Noah
Jakob Diehl as Adult Unknown
Claude Heinrich as Child Unknown
Hans Diehl as Elder Unknown

Main characters

Kahnwald family

Jonas Kahnwald / The Stranger / Adam
Jonas Kahnwald (portrayed by Louis Hofmann) is the son of Hannah and Michael Kahnwald.

The Stranger (portrayed by Andreas Pietschmann) is a time traveler working to undo many of the events that have taken place in Winden.

Adam (portrayed by Dietrich Hollinderbäumer) is the founder of Sic Mundus.

Mikkel Nielsen / Michael Kahnwald
Mikkel Nielsen (portrayed by Daan Lennard Liebrenz) is the son of Ulrich and Katharina Nielsen. At the age of 11, he travels back in time to 1986 where he is adopted by Ines Kahnwald and has his name changed to Michael Kahnwald. He later marries Hannah Krüger, with whom he fathers Jonas. On June 21, 2019, he commits suicide.

Hannah Kahnwald
Hannah Kahnwald (portrayed by Maja Schöne and Ella Lee) is the mother of Jonas Kahnwald and widow of Michael Kahnwald. In 1986, Hannah is shown to have an obsession with Ulrich Nielsen, even going as far as to accuse him of rape after discovering his affair with Katharina. In 2019, Hannah is having an affair with Ulrich, one which comes to an abrupt end due to Ulrich's disappearance.

Ines Kahnwald
Ines Kahnwald (portrayed by Angela Winkler and Anne Ratte-Polle) is the adoptive mother of Michael Kahnwald and the adoptive grandmother of Jonas Kahnwald. In 1986, she works as a nurse at the Winden Hospital.

Nielsen family

Ulrich Nielsen
Ulrich Nielsen (portrayed by Oliver Masucci and Ludger Bökelmann) is the husband of Katharina Nielsen, and the father of Martha, Magnus and Mikkel Nielsen. After Mikkel's disappearance, Ulrich suspects that Helge Doppler may have played a part in both the disappearance of his son and many other Winden children over the years, including his brother Mads. In an attempt to prevent this, Ulrich tries to travel back to 1986, but takes the wrong path and accidentally travels to 1953, meeting Helge as a 9-year old boy. Desperate to save his brother and his son, Ulrich tries to kill the child Helge with a rock, but is quickly arrested and imprisoned for the assault as well as allegedly murdering the 2 children whose corpses had just been discovered in the building site of the Winden Power Plant.

Katharina Nielsen
Katharina Nielsen (portrayed by Jördis Triebel and Nele Trebs) is the wife of Ulrich Nielsen and the mother of Martha, Magnus and Mikkel Nielsen.

Martha Nielsen / Female Stranger / Eva
Martha Nielsen (portrayed by Lisa Vicari) is the daughter of Ulrich and Katharina Nielsen.

Female Stranger (portrayed by Nina Kronjäger) is the adult version of Martha Nielsen who welcomes Jonas and young Martha to the future.

Eva (portrayed by Barbara Nüsse) is Adam's main opposition. She works tirelessly to ensure that the knot between the two worlds is never severed.

Magnus Nielsen
Magnus Nielsen (portrayed by Moritz Jahn) is the son of Ulrich and Katharina Nielsen. He is in a relationship with Franziska Doppler.

Jana Nielsen
Jana Nielsen (portrayed by Tatja Seibt) is the mother of Ulrich and Mads Nielsen and the wife of Tronte Nielsen. In 1986, Jana's son Mads goes missing which leaves Jana distraught and somewhat mentally damaged; ever since Jana held on to the belief that Mads may still be alive.

Tronte Nielsen
Tronte Nielsen (portrayed by Walter Kreye) is the father of Ulrich and Mads Nielsen and the husband of Jana Nielsen. In 2020, he is visited by Claudia Tiedemann who takes him to Regina's grave in 2053, and tells him that he must kill Regina in order to keep everything in order. Tronte then, in 2020, smothers Regina with a pillow telling her that it is the only way to save her.

Doppler family

Charlotte Doppler
Charlotte Doppler (portrayed by Karoline Eichhorn) is the mother of Franziska and Elisabeth Doppler and the wife of Peter Doppler. She is also the chief of the Winden Police. Charlotte was born in 2041 and as a baby, she was kidnapped (by an older version of herself and Elisabeth) from her parents, Hanno and Elisabeth, and was taken back in time to 1971, where she was given to H.G. Tannhaus - who would go on to become Charlotte's legal guardian. Charlotte's daughter Elisabeth is also her biological mother.

Franziska Doppler
Franziska Doppler (portrayed by Gina Alice Stiebitz) is the daughter of Charlotte and Peter Doppler.

Peter Doppler
Peter Doppler (portrayed by Stephan Kampwirth) is the husband of Charlotte Doppler, father of Elisabeth and Franziska Doppler and the son of Helge Doppler.

Helge Doppler
Helge Doppler (portrayed by Hermann Beyer and Peter Schneider) is the father of Peter Doppler. In 1953, at the age of 9, Helge is attacked by Ulrich Nielsen who tries to murder Helge after believing his older self to be responsible for the disappearance of Ulrich's son Mikkel. This attempted murder is unsuccessful, however, and Helge is just left with a scar on his face. After the attack, Helge awakes inside the bunker where he is transported through a wormhole to 1986. Here, Helge is taken under Noah's wing and manipulated into being his henchman, a role Helge would maintain for the next 40+ years. Over this time, Helge and Noah are responsible for the murder and disappearances of multiple children. In the present day, Helge has dementia, however he is still aware of his crimes and believes that he is able to travel back in time and change his acts. He attempts to do this by travelling back in time to 1986 and causing a car crash between himself and his younger self. This is unsuccessful in stopping young Helge as only old Helge is killed by the crash.

Elisabeth Doppler
Elisabeth Doppler (portrayed by Carlotta von Falkenhayn) is the daughter of Charlotte and Peter Doppler and the sister of Franziska Doppler. She is deaf. Following the apocalypse of 2020, Elisabeth marries Hanno Tauber, a.k.a. Noah, and in 2041 she gives birth to her own mother, Charlotte, who is then abducted by an older version of herself and Charlotte, and taken back in time to 1971.

H.G. Tannhaus
H.G. Tannhaus (portrayed by Christian Steyer) is Charlotte's guardian, a clockmaker, lecturer in theoretical physics, and the author of A Journey Through Time. Tannhaus is responsible for the creation of both Adam's world and Eva's world, as after the death of his son and daughter-in-law (in the Origin world), Tannhaus attempts to travel back in time, but in doing so, actually destroys the Origin world and creates Adam and Eva's

Tiedemann family

Regina Tiedemann
Regina Tiedemann (portrayed by Deborah Kaufmann and Lydia Makrides) is the mother of Bartosz Tiedemann, wife of Aleksander Tiedemann and daughter of Claudia Tiedemann and Bernd Doppler. She is the owner of the Waldhotel Winden and suffers from cancer. Following the apocalypse of 2020, Regina is briefly cared for by her mother Claudia before being asphyxiated and murdered by Tronte Nielsen who tells Regina that it is the only way to save her.

Bartosz Tiedemann
Bartosz Tiedemann (portrayed by Paul Lux) is the son of Regina and Aleksander Tiedemann. He is Jonas' best friend and also has a romantic relationship with Martha Nielsen. In 2019, Bartosz is visited by a priest who goes by the name of Noah and following many events that had transpired just as Noah had predicted, Bartosz agrees to do as he says. After travelling back to 1888, Bartosz fathers two children, Agnes and Hanno, the latter of which would grow up to become Noah.

Aleksander Tiedemann / Boris Niewald
Aleksander Tiedemann (portrayed by Peter Benedict) is the father of Bartosz Tiedemann and husband of Regina Tiedemann. He is also the current director of the Winden Nuclear Power Plant. It is later revealed that his real name is Boris Niewald, and that he had assumed the identity of Aleksander Köhler, a victim of a bank robbery that he was involved in; after marrying Regina he adopted her surname in a further attempt to disguise his real identity. Hannah Kahnwald is aware of Aleksander's true identity and uses this to blackmail him into doing as she demands.

Claudia Tiedemann
Claudia Tiedemann (portrayed by Julika Jenkins and Lisa Kreuzer) is the daughter of Egon and Doris Tiedemann and the mother of Regina Tiedemann. In 1986, she became the first female director of the Winden Nuclear Power Plant. In 1987, she is visited by her future self and is made aware of the existence of time travel. Claudia goes on to become the main opposition to Adam and Sic Mundus, and earns the nickname 'The White Devil'.

Egon Tiedemann
Egon Tiedemann (portrayed by Christian Pätzold) is the father of Claudia and Silja Tiedemann, the (ex-)husband of Doris Tiedemann and a police chief inspector. In 1954, Egon has an affair with Hannah Kahnwald and impregnates her. Hannah initially intends on getting an abortion but backs out last minute; she travels to 1987 and in 1988 gives birth to Egon's daughter Silja. In 1987, during a physical altercation with Claudia, Egon falls backwards and hits his head on a table; Claudia begins to call an ambulance, but remembers a conversation she had with her older self in which she was told that she must make sacrifices so that Regina can live, and hangs up. Egon, therefore, bleeds to death.

Hanno Tauber / Noah
Hanno Tauber (portrayed by Mark Waschke) is a dedicated follower of Sic Mundus who, on Adam's instructions, poses as a priest in Winden and kidnaps young children to be used in time travel experiments. He is, later, revealed to be the son of Bartosz and Silja Tiedemann. After the apocalypse, Noah marries Elisabeth Doppler and in 2041 she gives birth to their daughter, Charlotte. Shortly after this, Charlotte is kidnapped by an older version of herself and taken back to 1971; Noah, however, believes that Jonas and Claudia are to blame for the kidnapping of Charlotte. As Charlotte would go on to give birth to her own mother, Elisabeth, this means that Noah is married to his own granddaughter.

The Unknown

The Unknown
The Unknown (portrayed by Jakob Diehl, Claude Heinrich and Hans Diehl) is the son of Jonas Kahnwald and Martha Nielsen.

Recurring characters

Introduced in Series 1
Cordelia Wege as Greta Doppler, Bernd's wife and Helge's mother
Anatole Taubman and Michael Mendl as Bernd Doppler, Greta's husband, Helge's father and founder of the Winden power plant
Antje Traue as Agnes Nielsen, The Unknown's ex-wife; Tronte's mother, newly returned to Winden
Luise Heyer as Doris Tiedemann, Claudia's mother and Egon's wife
Florian Panzner as Daniel Kahnwald, Ines' father and the Winden chief of police
Lea van Acken as Silja Tiedemann, Elisabeth's interpreter and the daughter of Hannah Kahnwald and Egon Tiedemann
Leopold Hornung as Torben Wöller, a junior police officer in 2019–2020, Benni/Bernadette's brother
Anton Rubtsov as Benni/Bernadette, a transgender prostitute and Torben's sister
Lea Willkowsky as Jasmin Trewen, Claudia Tiedemann's secretary in 1986–1987
Tom Jahn as Jürgen Obendorf, Erik Obendorf's father

Introduced in Series 2
Sylvester Groth as W. Clausen, A police inspector called to Winden to investigate the missing persons of 2019
Katharina Spiering as Helene Albers, Katharina's abusive mother and a psychiatric nurse

References

Dark